Aigen is the name of several populated places in Austria. These include the following:

Aigen (Salzburg city district), a district of the city of Salzburg
Aigen im Ennstal, Styria
Aigen im Mühlkreis, Upper Austria
Aigen, a village in the municipality of Furth bei Göttweig, Lower Austria
Aigen, a cadastral community in the Strobl municipality, Salzburg state